Albertina Jaxa (born October 27, 1970) is a South African actress. Jaxa began
her career with roles on the television soap operas Generations (1993) and Isidingo (1998–2000).

During her
career, Jaxa has appeared in films such as Oddball Hall. (1990), The Bird Can't Fly. (2007), I Now Pronounce You Black and White. (2010), Of Good Report. (2013), Beyond Return and Wedding. (2016). She won an Africa Movie Academy Award for Best Film Best Supporting Actress in a Feature Film
in the 2013 romantic thriller film, Of Good Report. Jaxa had the leading roles in the eTV sitcom Madam & Eve (2002- 2005). Jaxa announced a hiatus from her
acting career in January 2014, during the break she lived in the city of Cape Town, her hiatus lasted nine months. Following her
long hiatus she made her
career comebacks, since her comeback she has appeared
in major television shows such as Shreds and Dreams,
Isikizi, 90 Plein Street,
Ashes to Ashes, Mzansi Magic drama series Nkululeko as well as having a starring role in the e.tv soap opera
Rhythm City as Andiswa. BET Redemption as Evelyn

Career
Jaxa began her career with roles on the television soap operas Generations (1993) and Isidingo (1998–2000).
During her
career, Jaxa has appeared in
films such as Oddball Hall.
(1990), The Bird Can't Fly. (2007),
I Now Pronounce You Black and White. (2010),
Of Good Report. (2013),
Beyond Return and Wedding. (2016).
She won
an Africa Movie Academy Award for Best Film Best Supporting Actress in a Feature Film
in the 2013
romantic thriller film,
Of Good Report.
Jaxa had
the leading roles
in the eTV
sitcom Madam & Eve (2002- 2005).
Jaxa announced
a hiatus from her
acting career
in January 2014,
during the break she lived
in the city of Cape Town,
her hiatus lasted nine months.
Following her
long hiatus
she made her
career comebacks,
since her comeback
she has appeared
in major television
shows such as
Shreds and Dreams,
Isikizi,
90 Plein Street,
Ashes to Ashes,
Mzansi Magic drama
series Nkululeko as well as having
a starring role
n the e.tv soap opera
Rhythm City as Andiswa.

1993-2004
Jaxa moved to
Gauteng, to
become an actress,
Jaxa began her
acting career in 1993,
when she starred in
the first ever episode
of SABC 1
hit drama
Generations,
she portrayed Priscilla Mthembu.

After several
seasons on Generations
she left the series
and joined the SABC 3
soapie Isidingo,
In 1996, Jaxa guest-starred on Tarzan: The Epic Adventures.
After being with the soap Isidingo
for three years she left the show.

Jaxa earned a
leading role on eTV
television sitcom Madam & Eve
in 2000,
as domestic maintenance
assistant Eve Sisulu,
and her acting
garnered positive reviews.

In 2004, she returned to
Isidingo, and later went
on to act in number of
television dramas and comedies,
including Khululeka,
7de Laan,
Charlie Jade,
The Final Verdict, Montana,
Stokvel,
Shreds and Dreams and the second season of Intersexions, appearing as guest.

Jaxa has appeared
in supporting roles in a
number of films,
including Oddball Hall (1990),

The Bird Can't Fly (2007),

I Now Pronounce You Black and White (2010),
Of Good Report (2013),

Beyond Return and Wedding (2016).

She has also appeared in three theatre productions, including Skewe Sirkel, (directed by Marthinus Basson); Rygrond, (directed by Charles Fourie); and Soweto, (directed by Phyllis Klotz).

2014–present
From 2015 to 2016,
Jaxa starred
in the critically acclaimed
e.tv original telenovela
series Gold Diggers as
May Gumede opposite Mxolisi Majozi,
Clementine Mosimane,
Menzi Ngubane,
Keneilwe Matidze,
Mpho Sibeko,
she received a South African Film and Television Award (SAFTA) for Best Actress for the role.
In 2016, Jaxa
also had starring roles
in two drama series.

First series was Isikizi,
a Mzansi Magic xhosa drama,
Jaxa received a
South African Film and Television Award (Safta) nomination for Best supporting actress in a TV drama for her work on Isikizi,

And played a supporting role in
eTV's Telenovela
Ashes to Ashes.

In June 2017,
she starred on e.tv
soapie Rhythm City in the role of Andiswa,
a small time criminal
involved with David Genaro.

In 2019 , Jaxa appeared as Noma in the SABC 1 popular comedy-drama Makoti.

Personal life
In 2000 Jaxa
married engineer
Prosper Mkwaiwa
in a lavish
ceremony held at
Usambara Wedding Village,
near Krugersdorp,
which reportedly cost R300,000.
The couple later
divorced after 15 years of marriage.

The couple had
two children together:
older son Leeroy Mkwaiwa, and son Farai.

Controversy
In 2015, weeks after the death of her ex-husband Prosper Mkwaiwa,
Jaxa was involved in a controversy with Tina Dlangwana (Mkwaiwa's second wife)
over who was the lawful spouse.

According to Sunday Sun Makwaiwa's mother and family recognise Tina Mkwaiwa (Prosper’s traditional wife), as the only true daughter-in-law.

In February 2015, it was reported on
Daily Sun that Jaxa was allegedly assaulted by her then 19-year-old son. According to the publication, the actress opened two assault cases against her son who attempted
to physically assault her, following her refusing to give him money.

Filmography

Television

References

Living people
1970 births
South African television actresses
21st-century South African actresses
South African film actresses